The 2014 season for the  cycling team began in February at the Grand Prix d'Ouverture La Marseillaise. The team participated in UCI Continental Circuits and UCI World Tour events when given a wildcard invitation.

2014 roster

Riders who joined the team for the 2014 season

Riders who left the team during or after the 2013 season

Season victories

Footnotes

References

2014 road cycling season by team
IAM Cycling
2014 in Swiss sport